La Roque-Alric is a commune in the Vaucluse department in the Provence-Alpes-Côte d'Azur region in southeastern France.

Geography
Placed on a rocky outcrop, La Roque-Alric is in the centre of the Dentelles de Montmirail.

Sights
The church is at the highest point in the village, reached by narrow streets, from where there is a view of the Dentelles de Montmirail.

See also
Communes of the Vaucluse department

References

Communes of Vaucluse